Adamic may refer to:

Various things related to the Biblical figure Adam
Adamic language
Adamic (surname)
Enochian, a language called "Adamical" by John Dee